North Country Community College is a public community college in Saranac Lake, New York. It is part of the State University of New York system. Founded in 1967, the college's main campus is located in Saranac Lake, New York, and it has additional locations in Malone and Ticonderoga. The college is sponsored by Franklin and Essex counties.

The college's enrollment is 751 full-time students and 1,142 part-time students. It employs 70 full-time faculty and another 70 adjunct faculty. The college offers 25 degree and certificate programs, a 15:1 student-teacher ratio, six athletic programs and two national honor societies. The college awarded $8.6 million in financial aid in 2018–19 and provides $400,000 in institutional scholarships each year.

North Country is the only public college located within the Adirondack Park.

Academics 
The college provides 25 degree and certificate programs, including the Associate of Arts, Associate of Science, and Associate of Applied Science degrees.

Transfer paths 
The college has numerous transfer paths within the State University of New York, as well as articulation agreements and transfer options to other four-year colleges and universities. In 2020, the college announced six new transfer pathways to allow NCCC graduates to earn bachelor's degrees from SUNY Empire in as little as one year after completing an associate degree.

Athletics 
College athletics are offered on the Saranac Lake campus and include men's and women's basketball, men's and women's soccer, women's lacrosse and women's volleyball. These sports are based at the Sparks Athletic Complex, which includes a gymnasium, pool, fitness center and team locker rooms.

North Country athletics has won over 10 NJCAA National Championships in a variety of sports. In 2019 and 2020, the college's women's basketball team won the NJCAA Region III championship and advanced to the national tournament both years.

Residence Life, Dining and Bookstores 
The North Country Community College Association provides on-campus housing for up to 96 students at its Saranac Lake campus.

The Association also provides dining services and operates bookstores on the Saranac Lake and Malone campuses.

Student life 
North Country offers a wide array of student activities on all three campuses: student group activities, student government, volunteer opportunities, career exploration, transfer planning, leadership development and health lifestyles. Many of the college's activities are centered around its location in the Adirondack Park. Hundreds of miles of hiking trails, lakes, and streams provide excellent opportunity for outdoor recreation nearby. The college's main campus is located near Lake Placid, Whiteface Mountain, located in Wilmington and the Olympic Center and Ski Jumps and Bobsled Track.

References

External links 
Official website

SUNY community colleges
Education in Essex County, New York
Education in Franklin County, New York
NJCAA athletics
Saranac Lake, New York